This is a list of political campaigns of the Chinese Communist Party (CCP) since the founding of the party in 1921 after the First World War.

See also
 History of China
 History of the Republic of China
 History of the Chinese Communist Party
 History of the People's Republic of China
 Timeline of Chinese history

References

 
Persecution of intellectuals